The Duplex Art Gallery is a private art gallery in Sarajevo, Bosnia and Herzegovina. It was established in 2004 by French artist Pierre Courtin. The twin galleries Galerija10m2 and Duplex100m2, that are run under the Duplex banner, have organized more than 200 exhibitions in Sarajevo and over 25 multimedia projects in Belgrade, Zagreb, Paris, Budapest, Athens, New Orleans, New York, Vienna, Lyon, Stockholm and Montreal.

References

External links
 Official website

Art museums established in 2004
Art museums and galleries in Bosnia and Herzegovina
Tourist attractions in Sarajevo
Culture in Sarajevo